Ahmed Kamil Plummer (born March 26, 1976) is a former  American football player who played six seasons for the San Francisco 49ers from 2000-2005. A 5'11", 191 lb. cornerback from Ohio State University, Plummer was selected by the 49ers in the first round (24th overall) in the 2000 NFL Draft. After only playing in 9 of the last 32 games due to injuries and missing significant parts of both 2004 and 2005 seasons, he announced his retirement from the NFL on June 16, 2006.

Plummer is the cousin of former NBA player, Brian Grant.

References

External links
Player Profile

1976 births
Living people
American football cornerbacks
People from Wyoming, Ohio
San Francisco 49ers players
Ohio State Buckeyes football players
Sportspeople from the Cincinnati metropolitan area
Players of American football from Ohio